Lost Trinity is a 1995 role-playing game adventure for Immortal: The Invisible War published by Precedence Entertainment.

Contents
Lost Trinity is the second scenario for Immortal and includes 17 full-color prints, a color map, and a CD containing music, effects, and a "Radio Eternity" broadcast which provides an early plot lead.

Reception
Lucya Szachnowski reviewed Lost Trinity for Arcane magazine, rating it a 7 out of 10 overall. Szachnowski comments that "The scenario uses an easy-to-follow format with plenty of referee's hints, tips, cues, background reminders and cross-references to relevant rules. This helps make the scenario a joy to referee, even if you have not run Immortal before."

Reviews
Dragon #233

References

Role-playing game adventures
Role-playing game supplements introduced in 1995